Daniel Donovan is an English keyboardist, composer, photographer and remixer. He was a founding member of Big Audio Dynamite and of Dreadzone.

Career
Following a brief touring stint with the Sisters of Mercy in 1990, he became a founding member of Dreadzone. Although he officially left Dreadzone during the development of Zion Youth, he returned in 1996.

He took the album cover photograph for Big Audio Dynamite's debut studio album, This Is Big Audio Dynamite (1985), which also meant that he wasn't featured in it. It was the same with their debut single "The Bottom Line".

Family
Donovan was named after his grandfather, Daniel Donovan through his father, also called Terence Daniel Donovan, the photographer. Through his father he is related to half sister Daisy Donovan and Rockstar Games co-founder Terry Donovan. He was married to the actress, model and singer Patsy Kensit, from 1988 to 1991.

Discography

With Big Audio Dynamite
This Is Big Audio Dynamite (1985)
No. 10, Upping St. (1986)
Tighten Up Vol. 88 (1988)
Megatop Phoenix (1989)

With Screaming Target
Hometown Hi-Fi (1991, Island Records)

With Dreadzone
 360°
 Second Light (1995, Virgin Records)
 Zion Youth (1995, Virgin Records)
 Moving On (1997, Virgin Records)
 Biological Radio (1997, Virgin Records)
 The Radio 1 Sessions (2001, Strange Fruit)
 Sound (2002)
 Once Upon a Time (2005)
 Eye on the Horizon (2010)

References

External links
Official website
 
 
 

Year of birth missing (living people)
Living people
English rock keyboardists
English dance musicians
English hip hop musicians
Big Audio Dynamite members
Musicians from London